Barocius is an ancient lunar impact crater that is located in the rugged southern highlands of the Moon. It was named after Italian mathematician Francesco Barozzi. It lies just to the southeast of the large crater Maurolycus. To the southwest of Barocius is Clairaut, and to the south-southeast lies Breislak.

The rim of Barocius has been worn and eroded by countless subsequent impacts. Of these the most notable is Barocius B which lies across the northeast rim, and intrudes into Barocius C. There is a remnant of a crater, Barocius W, that lies just inside the southwest interior wall. On the interior floor is a low central peak offset to the north of the floor midpoint.

Satellite craters
By convention these features are identified on lunar maps by placing the letter on the side of the crater midpoint that is closest to Barocius.

References

External links
 

Impact craters on the Moon